S. formosa may refer to:

 Segmentorbis formosa, a ram's horn snail
 Seguenzia formosa, a sea snail
 Sitta formosa, an Asian nuthatch
 Squatina formosa, an angel shark
 Swainsona formosa, an Australian plant